Malibagh is the name of a neighborhood in Dhaka, the capital of Bangladesh. It is under Shahjahanpur Thana. The word 'mali' means gardener and the word 'bagh' means garden. Thus, the literal meaning of 'Malibagh' is gardener's garden or neighborhood. It is a densely populated area near Maghbazar. This area is occupied with many business shops, markets, offices, schools, and colleges. It is one of the busiest traffic spots of Dhaka City.

References

Neighbourhoods in Dhaka